or  is a river in the municipality of Rana in Nordland county, Norway, which flows in a southern and southwestern direction. On its direction mainly southwards, it meets and becomes a part of Randalselva, which has its beginning in the Norwegian-Swedish border regions. At Elvmøthei in the Dunderland Valley, Randalselva then meets Virvasselva and thus forms the beginning of Ranelva.

Name
The name is of Sami origin. Gubbelt means "valley in the mountain", and ædno means "large river". Gubbeltåga is first mentioned in written records in 1742, during legal depositions in Selfors and in Gildeskål. These were connected to the drawing of the borders between Norway and Sweden after the Great Northern War, a process leading to two different laws of the border in 1752.

Media gallery

See also
List of rivers in Norway

References

Rivers of Nordland
Rana, Norway
Rivers of Norway